"Here We Go" is May J.'s first single, released on December 20, 2006. It features the M-Flo member, the rapper Verbal. Despite having released a collaborative single and a mini-album in the past, May J. had not previously released a solo single. The song received no promotion other than its performance at Cassie's concert in Tokyo, and hence performed poorly on the Oricon charts, entering the charts and peaking at just number 70.

The single includes a remix of her first promoted song, "My Girls", from her mini-album All My Girls. However, the version on this single differs in being written entirely in English, reflecting May J.'s American background.

"Here We Go" was the ending theme song for the popular music show Hey! Hey! Hey! for the month of December.

A remix of "Here We Go" featuring Verbal and Taro Soul is included on May J.'s second single, "Dear…".

Track listing
 "Here We Go" (featuring Verbal) (Emi K. Lynn, Verbal, Icedown) - 4:50
 "Movin' On" (May J., Shingo S.) - 3:52
 "My Girls (Studio Apartment Remix)" (Cheryl Lynn, David Paich, David Foster, May J., H.U.B., Icedown) - 4:55
 "Here We Go (Back Track)" - 4:49
 "Movin' On (Back Track)" - 3:51

Charts
Oricon Sales Chart (Japan)

2006 singles
Songs written by Verbal (rapper)
2006 songs
Ki/oon Music singles